Alamosite (Pb12Si12O36) is a colorless silicate mineral named after the place where it was discovered, Álamos, Sonora, Mexico.  It is a rare secondary mineral occurring in the oxidized zones of lead-rich deposits. For example, the infobox picture shows its association with black leadhillite.

References

Inosilicates
Monoclinic minerals
Minerals in space group 13